The 2021–22 Missouri Tigers women's basketball team represented the University of Missouri during the 2021–22 NCAA Division I women's basketball season. The Tigers, led by twelfth-year head coach Robin Pingeton, played their home games at Mizzou Arena and competed as members of the Southeastern Conference (SEC).

Previous season
The Tigers finished the season 9–13 (5–9 SEC) to finish in tenth place in the conference. The Tigers were invited to the 2021 Women's National Invitation Tournament where they lost to Fresno State in the first round.

Offseason

Departures

2021 recruiting class

Incoming transfer

Roster

Schedule

|-
!colspan=9 style=| Exhibition

|-
!colspan=9 style=| Non-conference regular season

|-
!colspan=9 style=| SEC regular season

|-
!colspan=9 style=| SEC Tournament

|-
!colspan=9 style=| WNIT

See also
2021–22 Missouri Tigers men's basketball team

References

Missouri Tigers women's basketball seasons
Missouri
Missouri Tigers
Missouri Tigers
Missouri